The Ghislieri, or less commonly Ghisleri, were an ancient Bolognese aristocratic family :

Ghislieri
Michele Ghislieri (1504–1572), also known as Pope Pius V.
Ghislieri College
Ghislieri Choir and Consort, Giulio Prandi

Ghisleri
Arcangelo Ghisleri (1855–1938), an Italian journalist.

References

Italian-language surnames